Colobothea cincticornis is a species of beetle in the family Cerambycidae. It was described by Schaller in 1783.

References

cincticornis
Beetles described in 1783